Cereal is a hamlet within Special Area No. 3 in central Alberta, Canada. It was named after the post office that was established in the area in 1910. The name of the post office alluded to grain fields near the community. Cereal held village status prior to 2021.

History 
Cereal incorporated as a village on August 19, 1914. It relinquished its village status on January 1, 2021 when it dissolved to become a hamlet under the jurisdiction of Special Area No. 3.

Demographics 
In the 2016 Census of Population conducted by Statistics Canada, Cereal recorded a population of 111 living in 59 of its 63 total private dwellings, a  change from its 2011 population of 134.

In the 2011 Census, Cereal had a population of 134 living in 71 of its 79 total dwellings, a 6.3% change from its 2006 population of 126.

Notable people 
Debby Carlson, Canadian politician, Liberal MLA (1993–2004)
Marlene Streit, amateur golfer - won the Australian, British, Canadian and U.S. Women's Amateurs

See also 
List of communities in Alberta
List of hamlets in Alberta

References 

1914 establishments in Alberta
2021 disestablishments in Alberta
Special Area No. 3
Hamlets in Alberta